Morgane may refer to:

People
 Morgane Dubled (born 1984), French supermodel
 Morgane Tschiember (born 1976), artist
 Morgane (born 1975), belgian singer

Other uses
 Greta morgane (thick-tipped greta), a butterfly in the family Nymphalidae
 Morgane le Fay, a powerful sorceress in Arthurian legend
 Morgane, a character in the 2018 French-Belgian film Girls With Balls

See also
Morgan (disambiguation)
Morgana (disambiguation)